Re Badeck's application (2000) C-158/97 is a German and EU labour law case concerning positive action.

Facts
The First Minister and Attorney General of Hesse, CDU member Georg Badeck, wanted to review a Hesse law which set out a list of positive action measures for appointment to public office. They argued it violated the German Grundgesetz constitutional duty to get the best people for the job, and violated the Equal Treatment Directive 76/207/EC articles 2(1) and 2(4).

Judgment
The European Court of Justice held that priority for under represented groups was lawful, but that priority could not be automatic. The following public sector positive action measures were in fact legitimate under article 2(4): (1) aiming to get a parity split of men and women in the public sector, (2) providing a quota for female academic staff too, (3) reserving half the training places in certain fields for women, (4) providing that suitably qualified women would be guaranteed an interview, and an equal number to men. The summary of the judgment on the limits and what is not precluded by EU law was stated as follows.

See also

Notes

References
E McGaughey, A Casebook on Labour Law (Hart 2019) ch 14, 618

2000 in the European Union
Court of Justice of the European Union case law
German case law
2000 in case law
2000 in Germany
European Union labour case law